There are at least sixteen lakes named Mud Lake within the U.S. state of Oregon.  Some have an alternate name of Mud Lake, but are listed here by their primary name.

See also 
 List of lakes in Oregon

References
 USGS-U.S. Board on Geographic Names

Lakes of Oregon